The 2017 ToyotaCare 250 was the eighth stock car race of the 2017 NASCAR Xfinity Series season and the 30th iteration of the event. The race was held on Saturday, April 29, 2017, in Richmond, Virginia at Richmond Raceway, a 0.75 miles (1.21 km) D-shaped oval. The race was extended from its scheduled 250 laps to 254 due to a NASCAR overtime finish. At race's end, Kyle Larson, driving for Chip Ganassi Racing, would steal the victory on the final restart when the race would end under caution due to a wreck on the backstretch. The win was Larson's seventh career NASCAR Xfinity Series win and his second of the season. To fill out the podium, Justin Allgaier of JR Motorsports and Daniel Hemric of Richard Childress Racing would finish second and third, respectively.

Background 

Richmond International Raceway (RIR) is a 3/4-mile (1.2 km), D-shaped, asphalt race track located just outside Richmond, Virginia in Henrico County. It hosts the Monster Energy NASCAR Cup Series and Xfinity Series. Known as "America's premier short track", it formerly hosted a NASCAR Camping World Truck Series race, an IndyCar Series race, and two USAC sprint car races.

Entry list 

 (R) denotes rookie driver.
 (i) denotes driver who is ineligible for series driver points.

Practice

First practice 
The first practice session was held on Friday, April 28, at 1:00 PM EST, and would last for 55 minutes.

Second and final practice 
The second and final practice session, sometimes referred to as Happy Hour, was held on Friday, April 28, at 3:00 PM EST, and would last for 55 minutes.

Qualifying 
Qualifying was held on Saturday, April 29, at 10:05 AM EST. Since Richmond Raceway is under 2 miles (3.2 km), the qualifying system was a multi-car system that included three rounds. The first round was 15 minutes, where every driver would be able to set a lap within the 15 minutes. Then, the second round would consist of the fastest 24 cars in Round 1, and drivers would have 10 minutes to set a lap. Round 3 consisted of the fastest 12 drivers from Round 2, and the drivers would have 5 minutes to set a time. Whoever was fastest in Round 3 would win the pole.

Two drivers would fail to qualify: Tommy Joe Martins and Morgan Shepherd.

Full qualifying results

Race results 
Stage 1 Laps: 75

Stage 2 Laps: 75

Stage 3 Laps: 104

Standings after the race 

Drivers' Championship standings

Note: Only the first 12 positions are included for the driver standings.

References 

2017 NASCAR Xfinity Series
NASCAR races at Richmond Raceway
April 2017 sports events in the United States
2017 in sports in Virginia